Felipe Andrés Brito Aguilera (born 25 August 1996) is a Chilean footballer who plays as a forward for Luis Ángel Firpo in the Primera División de El Salvador.

Club career
As a youth player, Brito was with Audax Italiano before joining the Universidad de Chile youth system in October 2012. As a member of Universidad de Chile, he played on loan at San Marcos de Arica and Deportes La Serena.

After stints with Deportes Vallenar and Trasandino in his homeland, he moved abroad and joined the Bosnian side  in 2022.

In 2023, he signed with Luis Ángel Firpo in the Primera División de El Salvador.

References

External links

1996 births
Living people
Place of birth missing (living people)
Association football forwards
Chilean footballers
Chilean expatriate footballers
Universidad de Chile footballers
San Marcos de Arica footballers
Deportes La Serena footballers
Deportes Vallenar footballers
Trasandino footballers
C.D. Luis Ángel Firpo footballers
Chilean Primera División players
Primera B de Chile players
Segunda División Profesional de Chile players
Salvadoran Primera División players
Chilean expatriate sportspeople in Bosnia and Herzegovina
Chilean expatriate sportspeople in El Salvador
Expatriate footballers in Bosnia and Herzegovina
Expatriate footballers in El Salvador